Galbenu is a commune located in Brăila County, Muntenia, Romania. It is composed of five villages: Drogu, Galbenu, Pântecani, Sătuc and Zamfirești.

References

Communes in Brăila County
Localities in Muntenia